Jason Peter Walker (born 1969) is a New Zealand-Australian country musician and writer. His third album, Ceiling Sun Letters was nominated for the ARIA Award for Best Country Album at the ARIA Music Awards of 2010.

As a writer Walker has published two biographies, Gram Parsons: God's Own Singer (2002) and Billy Thorpe's Time on Earth (2009).

Biography 
Born in New Zealand in 1969, Jason Walker moved to Sydney, Australia at age 18. In 1997 he joined Golden Rough on guitar alongside Brian Crouch on piano, David Orwell on vocals and guitar, Helen Meany on bass guitar and vocals, and Martin McDonald on drums. That group had started two years earlier as a covers band, playing Elvis Costello, Willie Nelson and Gram Parsons material. In 1998 they released their debut album of originals, Twin Firs.

Walker's debut studio album, Stranger to Someone, was issued via Laughing Outlaw Records in October 2001. Delusions of Adequacys Geoff Parks compared him with Ryan Adams and opined that Walker was "out there on the edges, pushing harder, moving quicker than Adams, who has now become a mainstream media darling." Parks noticed "[Walker's] maturity and songwriting finesse shine through... But it’s on the cover versions featured here that you can hear [his] soul stretching out... [on] this country-fried, cosmic rock album."

As a writer Walker published a biography of Parsons, God's Own Singer, in 2002. He had started the project in 1996 and told Bill Beaver and Steve Wilcock of Triste magazine that "it completely dominated my life. Everything I did hinged upon the availability of working computers and printers so I could work on it whenever I wanted. I even started working on it during my day job, which was really taking the piss. I almost got fired."

Walker released his second studio album, Ashes & Wine in November 2003, providing lead vocals and lead guitar, with a backing band, the Last Drinks, consisting of Brian Crouch on keyboards, Dave Keys on bass guitar, Andrew Lay on drums and Worth Wagers on rhythm guitar. 

His second biography was of Billy Thorpe: Billy Thorpe's Time on Earth and released in 2009. 

Walker's third studio album, Ceiling Sun Letters was released in May 2010. It  was nominated for Best Country Album at the ARIA Music Awards of 2010. 

Walker's fourth studio album, All-Night Ghost Town, was released on 5 August 2016 and included the single "Borrowed Tunes".

Discography

Albums

Awards and nominations

ARIA Music Awards

! 
|-
| 2010 || Ceiling Sun Letters || ARIA Award for Best Country Album ||  ||

Bibliography

References

External links
 

1969 births
Australian country singers
Australian male singers
New Zealand emigrants to Australia
Living people